McCool Stadium, officially known as Travis E. Parker Field at Horace L. McCool Stadium, is the home playing venue for the Delta State Statesmen football team. Located in Cleveland, Mississippi, the stadium has a capacity of 8,000. Originally constructed in 1970, the stadium is one of the Gulf South Conference’s most historic venues.

History
The stadium was built in 1970, as a replacement for the "old" Delta Field, and was called Delta Field and Travis E. Parker Field. The first game it hosted was a Delta State win over Southeast Missouri State, 14-8. In 2007, the university recognized Horace L. McCool, one of the greatest collegiate head coaches in Mississippi football history. McCool served as the head coach of the Statesmen from 1961-1973, which helped open the new stadium at the time in 1970. Over the span of those 13 seasons, McCool recorded 76 wins, 48 losses and three ties, including six-straight winning seasons. Horace McCool still stands as the all-time record for a head coach at Delta State, and he continues on being the only coach in Statesman history to have six-consecutive winning seasons as a head coach.

Renovations
The first of many renovations to McCool Stadium was in 1993. The university replaced certain seating sections the stadium with green chairback seats to give the spectators more comfort. A new scoreboard as well as a video board were added in 2008. The press box was renovated in May 2013 and includes booths for radio, film, coaches, and working press, as well as a snack-kitchen and restroom. Adding artificial turf in 2014 to the football field is one of the most recent additions to the stadium.

Attendance records

References

External links
Official Delta State facility webpage

College football venues
American football venues in Mississippi
Delta State Statesmen football
Buildings and structures in Bolivar County, Mississippi
Cleveland, Mississippi